The name St. Augustine High School could refer to:

In the United States:
St. Augustine Academy  (Lakewood, Ohio) 
St. Augustine High School (Laredo, Texas)
St. Augustine High School (New Orleans), Louisiana
St. Augustine High School (San Diego, California) 
St. Augustine High School (Florida) (near St. Augustine)
St. Augustine Catholic High School (Tucson,  Arizona) 
St. Augustine Academy  (Ventura, California)
St. Augustine College Preparatory School, New Jersey

In Canada:
St. Augustine Catholic High School (Ontario), Markham, Ontario
St. Augustine Catholic Secondary School, Brampton, Ontario

In United Kingdom:
St Augustine Academy, Maidstone, Kent, England
St Augustine's Church of England High School, Kilburn, London, England
St. Augustine's High School, Edinburgh, Scotland
St Augustine's High School, Redditch, England
St Augustine's RC High School, Billington, Lancashire, England

See also
St. Augustine Catholic High School (disambiguation)
St Augustine's Catholic School, Scarborough, England
St Augustine's Church of England High School, London, England
St Augustine of Canterbury Catholic Academy , St Helens, England
St. Augustine's College (disambiguation)
Father Augustine Tolton Regional Catholic High School, Columbia, Missouri, United States
St Augustine's Catholic College, Trowbridge, England
Saint Augustine Elementary School (disambiguation)
St Augustine of Canterbury School (disambiguation)
Colegio San Agustin (disambiguation)
Saint Augustine (disambiguation)